{{Infobox pageant titleholder
| name         = Imelda Fransisca
| photo        = 
| caption      = 
| education    = Ohio State University, U.S.
| alma_mater   = 
| occupation   = Psychologist
| years_active = 2005–2006 (as Miss Indonesia 2005)
| birth_name   = 
| alias        = 
| birth_date   = 
| birth_place  = Bogor, Indonesia
| competitions = Miss Indonesia 2005
| spouse       = 
}}

Imelda Fransisca (born 24 September 1982 in Bogor, West Java) was the first Miss Indonesia in 2005.  She went on to compete in the Miss ASEAN 2005 pageant, where she was the first runner up.

She also wrote a motivational book titled You Can Be Anything and Make Changes'' (2006) where she discussed abuse she suffered as a child in Singapore.  Her only "friend" during that ordeal became food, and she became somewhat overweight, but later lost the weight due to anorexia. She attended college at Ohio State University in the United States and graduated in 2004.

After the 2004 Indian Ocean earthquake and tsunami, Fransisca accompanied Miss World 2004, Maria Julia Mantilla Garcia, Eric Tsang, and Jackie Chan to visit hard hit areas of Sumatra.

References

Indonesian television presenters
Indonesian women television presenters
Living people
Miss Indonesia winners
People from Bogor
Sundanese people
1982 births